Vilniaus Street is a central and the oldest street in the Kaunas Old Town.

It used to part of the old road to Lithuania's capital city Vilnius, however currently it is dedicated exclusively for pedestrians, open-air cafés, etc.

Most of the buildings in the street dates to the 16th century, however some were reconstructed, and the Kaunas Cathedral Basilica was built in the early 15th century.

References

Streets in Kaunas